The "Evil Empire" speech was a speech delivered by U.S. President Ronald Reagan to the National Association of Evangelicals on March 8, 1983 at the height of Cold War and Soviet-Afghan War. In that speech, Reagan referred to the Soviet Union as an "evil empire" and as "the focus of evil in the modern world". Reagan explicitly rejected the notion that the United States and the Soviet Union were equally responsible for the Cold War and the ongoing nuclear arms race between the two nations; rather, he asserted that the conflict was a battle between good and evil.

Background

British House of Commons speech
Reagan's chief speechwriter at the time, Anthony R. Dolan, reportedly coined the phrase for Reagan's use. Some sources refer to the June 1982 speech before the British House of Commons in London as the "Evil Empire" speech, but while Reagan referred twice to totalitarianism in his London speech, the exact phrase "evil empire" was not included. Rather, the London speech included the phrase "ash heap of history", used by Reagan to predict what he saw as the inevitable failure and collapse of global communism. Bolshevik revolutionary Leon Trotsky used a similar phrase in November 1917, asserting that the Mensheviks belonged in the "dustbin of history".

Speech
Reagan's March 8, 1983 speech to the National Association of Evangelicals in Orlando, Florida, is his first recorded use of the phrase "evil empire." The speech has become known as the "Evil Empire" speech. In that speech, Reagan said:

Yes, let us pray for the salvation of all of those who live in that totalitarian darkness—pray they will discover the joy of knowing God. But until they do, let us be aware that while they preach the supremacy of the State, declare its omnipotence over individual man, and predict its eventual domination of all peoples on the earth, they are the focus of evil in the modern world ....
So, in your discussions of the nuclear freeze proposals, I urge you to beware the temptation of pride—the temptation of blithely declaring yourselves above it all and label both sides equally at fault, to ignore the facts of history and the aggressive impulses of an evil empire, to simply call the arms race a giant misunderstanding and thereby remove yourself from the struggle between right and wrong and good and evil.

In the "Evil Empire" speech, which also dealt with domestic issues, Reagan made the case for deploying NATO nuclear-armed intermediate-range ballistic missiles in Western Europe as a response to the Soviets installing new nuclear-armed missiles in Eastern Europe. Eventually, the NATO missiles were set up and used as bargaining chips in arms talks with Soviet leader Mikhail Gorbachev, who took office two years and three days after Reagan's speech, on 11 March 1985. At the Washington Summit in 1987, Reagan and Gorbachev agreed to go further than a nuclear freeze. In an Atomic Age first, they signed the Intermediate-Range Nuclear Forces Treaty, agreeing to reduce nuclear arsenals. Intermediate- and shorter-range nuclear missiles were eliminated.

Global reaction and aftermath
In 1987, American conservative Michael Johns compiled a list of Soviet crimes, echoing Reagan by saying "what we face today in Soviet Communism is, indeed, an evil empire".

The Soviet Union, for its part, alleged that the United States was an imperialist superpower seeking to dominate the entire world, and that the Soviet Union was fighting against it "in the name of humanity". In Moscow, the Soviet state-run press agency TASS said the "evil empire" words demonstrated that the Reagan administration "can think only in terms of confrontation and bellicose, lunatic anti-communism".

During his second term in office, in May–June 1988, more than five years after using the term "evil empire", Reagan visited the new reformist General Secretary of the Soviet Union, Mikhail Gorbachev, in Moscow. When asked by a reporter whether he still thought the Soviet Union was an evil empire, Reagan responded that he no longer did, and that when he used the term it was "another time, another era".

Historians such as Yale University's John Lewis Gaddis have grown more favorable towards the use and influence of the phrase "evil empire" in describing the Soviet Union. In The Cold War Gaddis argues that, in their use of the phrase "evil empire", Reagan and his anti-communist political allies were effective in breaking the détente tradition, thus laying the groundwork for the ultimate collapse of the Soviet Union.

The term has also been alluded to in reference to the domestic politics of the United States itself. American conservative journalist Pat Buchanan argued that Russia's President Vladimir Putin implied that the United States under the Obama administration deserved the title in the 21st century, and furthermore argued that Putin had a good case for doing so because of American views on abortion and same-sex marriage (that was criminalized in the Soviet Union), pornography, promiscuity and the general panoply of Hollywood values. Buchanan served as White House Communications Director for President Reagan from 1985 to 1987.

See also
 Tear down this wall!
 Speeches and debates of Ronald Reagan
 Chicken Kiev speech
 Axis of evil

References

Further reading

External links

 Video of Ronald Reagan's Evil Empire speech
 Audio of Ronald Reagan's Evil Empire speech
 Text of Ronald Reagan's Evil Empire speech
 Text of Ronald Reagan's Evil Empire speech (British House of Commons speech) 

1983 in international relations
1983 speeches
American political catchphrases
American political neologisms
Anti-communist terminology
Cold War speeches
English phrases
Foreign relations of the Soviet Union
History of the foreign relations of the United States
March 1983 events in the United States
Political quotes
Soviet Union–United States relations
Speeches by Ronald Reagan